Sourabh Vij (born 14 June 1987) is an Indian shot putter. He won gold at the second Commonwealth Youth Games. In 2006 he won an Asian Junior silver medal and represented India at the 2006 World Junior Championships in Athletics.

After appearances at the Asian Indoor Games, he came to prominence in 2010 with an unratified national record-beating throw of 20.65 metres. Second place at the national championships guaranteed him a spot at the 2010 Commonwealth Games in his hometown of New Delhi. His test from the championships came back positive for the banned substance methylhexaneamine, however, and he was banned from competition, missing the Games.

Career
Born in New Delhi, Vij won his first medal at the 2004 Commonwealth Youth Games, where his mark of 18.45 metres brought him the shot put gold medal (India's second athletics gold of the competition along with Hari Shankar Roy). He began competing as a junior with a 6 kg implement in 2005. His first successes came the following year: he won the national junior championships, took a silver medal at the 2006 Asian Junior Athletics Championships and represented India at the 2006 World Junior Championships in Athletics in Beijing, where he finished seventh in the shot put final. He moved up into the senior ranks the following year and finished ninth at the 2007 Asian Indoor Games. He returned to the competition two years later and his throw of 18.38 m at the 2009 Asian Indoor Games brought him a fifth-place finish.

He earned himself a place in the main national team in the buildup to the 2010 Commonwealth Games in his hometown of Delhi. Having consistently thrown over 20 metres that season, he surpassed Shakti Singh's decade-old Indian record of 20.42 m by some distance with a put of 20.65 m to win at the Delhi State Annual Athletics Championships. However, the mark could not be ratified as the meeting did not conduct any of the necessary doping tests or have an official from the Athletics Federation of India present. The following week he competed at the Asian All-Star Meet – a test event for the forthcoming Commonwealth Games athletics competition. He had a best mark of 19.09 m and finished runner-up behind Om Prakash Singh. At the Indian Inter-State Championships in August he was again runner-up to Singh, but threw a more-impressive 19.91 m – eight centimetres off the winning mark. His plans to represent his nation at the Commonwealth Games in his hometown finished abruptly as his doping test at the championships came back positive for the banned substance methylhexaneamine (a stimulant). The failed test was one of seven positive results for the drug, coming at the same time as those for discus thrower Akash Antil and six wrestlers, including Rajiv Tomar.

Competition record

See also
List of doping cases in athletics

References

External links

1987 births
Living people
People from New Delhi
Indian male shot putters
Doping cases in athletics
Athletes (track and field) at the 2010 Asian Games
Indian sportspeople in doping cases
Commonwealth Games competitors for India
Athletes (track and field) at the 2010 Commonwealth Games
Athletes from Delhi
Asian Games competitors for India